Don't Forget Me may refer to:
 Don't Forget Me (horse) (1984–2010), Thoroughbred racehorse
 Don't Forget Me (2016 film), a 2016 Korean film
 Don't Forget Me (Al tishkechi oti), a 2017 Israeli film by Ram Nehari that won the 35th Torino Film Festival
 Don't Forget Me, a 1996 Croatian film
 "Don't Forget Me" (Smash song), a 2012 song from the TV series Smash
 "Don't Forget Me" (1927 song), a song by the band 1927
 "Don't Forget Me (When I'm Gone)", a 1986 song by Glass Tiger
 "Don't Forget Me", a song by the Red Hot Chili Peppers from By the Way
 "Don't Forget Me", a song by the Gear Daddies from Let's Go Scare Al
 "Don't Forget Me", a song by Mark Lanegan from Field Songs
 "Don't Forget Me", a song by Way Out West from Don't Look Now
 "Don't Forget Me", a song by Harry Nilsson from Pussy Cats
 "Don't Forget Me", a song by Monni

See also
 Don't You Forget About Me (disambiguation)